The 2013 Saint Paul mayoral election was held on November 5, 2013 to elect the Mayor of Saint Paul, Minnesota for a four-year term. Incumbent Chris Coleman won re-election for a third term in the first round with 78.23% of the vote.

This was the first mayoral election in the city's history to use instant-runoff voting, popularly known as ranked choice voting, which was adopted by voters during the city's 2009 elections. Saint Paul did not hold a primary election on August 16, the 2013 date for primaries in Minnesota.

Background
On April 3, 2013, incumbent mayor Chris Coleman, who has been in office since 2006, announced that he would seek a third term as mayor. He was endorsed by the Saint Paul City DFL on June 10, 2013.

Results

References

External links
 Ramsey County Elections
 Elections & Voting - Minnesota Secretary of State

Mayoral elections in Saint Paul, Minnesota
2013 Minnesota elections
2013 in Minnesota
Saint Paul